Chandranagar is a commercial and residential area in Palakkad city, Kerala, India.
Chandranagar housing Society, founded in 1956, is the first housing colony in the state and one of the largest.

References

2.https://lsgkerala.gov.in/en/lbelection/electdmemberdet/2010/888

Cities and towns in Palakkad district
Suburbs of Palakkad